Zhangjiakou railway station can refer to:

Zhangjiakou railway station (opened in 1957), a station on the Beijing-Zhangjiakou intercity railway
Zhangjiakou railway station (opened in 1909), a station closed in July 2014

See also
Zhangjiakou South railway station